ASEAN Station (formerly Sisingamangaraja Station) is a rapid transit station on the North-South Line of the Jakarta MRT in Jakarta, Indonesia. Located on Jl. Sisingamangaraja XII in Kebayoran Baru, South Jakarta, it is the last elevated station (when heading north towards ) on the MRT. It is connected to the TransJakarta bus rapid transit at the CSW-ASEAN TOD.

Location 

The northernmost elevated station on the MRT, ASEAN station is located on Jl. Sisingamangaraja XII in Selong, Kebayoran Baru, South Jakarta. Nearby the station are Association of Southeast Asian Nations (ASEAN) secretariat, Indonesian National Police headquarters, Al-Azhar Great Mosque and Al-Azhar Indonesia University campus as well as government buildings such as campuses of Ministry of Agrarian Affairs and Spatial Planning (National Land Agency) and Ministry of Public Works and People's Housing.

History 
The station was originally named Sisingamangaraja Station (hence the station code), from the street is the station located. The name then changed to ASEAN Station due to its close location to the ASEAN Secretariat. Its name change is originally a part of MRT station naming rights, but Jakarta MRT gave the naming rights of the station to ASEAN free of charge.

The connection to the TransJakarta bus rapid transit at the CSW-ASEAN TOD was opened in December 2021.

Building plan

Gallery

References

External links 
 
  ASEAN Station on the Jakarta MRT website

South Jakarta
Jakarta MRT stations
Railway stations opened in 2019